The 2008–09 AWIHL season was the second season of the Australian Women's Ice Hockey League. It ran from 11 October 2008 until 1 February 2009.

Regular season
The regular season begins on 11 October 2008 and will run through to 1 February 2009

October

November

December

January

February

Standings
Note: GP = Games played; W = Wins; L = Losses; T = Ties; GF = Goals for; GA = Goals against; GDF = Goal differential; PTS = Points

Win = 2 pts
Tie = 1 pt
Loss = 0 pts

The regular season league standings are as follows:

Scoring leadersNote: GP = Games played; G = Goals; A = Assists; Pts = Points; PIM = Penalty minutesLeading goaltendersNote: GP = Games played; Mins = Minutes played; W = Wins; L = Losses: T = Ties; GA = Goals Allowed; SO = Shutouts; GAA = Goals against average''

Playoffs

The finals series was hosted in Newcastle, New South Wales at Hunter Ice Skating Stadium over the weekend of 14–15 February 2015.

Semi Final Game 1

Semi Final Game 2

Consolation final

Grand Final

See also

 Brisbane Goannas vs Melbourne Dragons Consolation final - Game Images Pics by Wulos
 Sydney Sirens vs Adelaide Assassins Grand Final - Game Images Pics by Wulos
Ice Hockey Australia
Joan McKowen Memorial Trophy

References

External links 
Australian Women's Hockey League official site
Adelaide Adrenaline official site
Brisbane Goannas official site
Melbourne Ice official Site
Sydney Sirens

Australian Women's Ice Hockey League seasons
Aust
ice hockey
ice hockey